Barry W. Ache is an American neuroscientist currently a Distinguished Professor of Biology and Neuroscience at Whitney Laboratory for Marine Bioscience, University of Florida.

References

Year of birth missing (living people)
Living people
University of Florida faculty
American neuroscientists